Junggye-dong is a dong, neighbourhood of Nowon-gu in Seoul, South Korea.

In April 2013, multiplex cinema CGV Junggye opened in Junggye-dong. The neighborhood centers around bank intersection, named for the four banks on each of the four corners.

See also 
Administrative divisions of South Korea

References

External links
 Nowon-gu Official site in English
 Map of Nowon-gu
 Nowon-gu Official site
 Junggye 1-dong Resident office 

Neighbourhoods of Nowon District